Lake Creek may refer to:

Communities
 Lake Creek Township, Calhoun County, Iowa, one of seventeen townships
 Lake Creek, Oregon, an unincorporated community located near Eagle Point
 Lake Creek, Texas, an unincorporated community located near Cooper
 Lake Creek, an area in which the unincorporated community of Dutzow, Missouri is located

Streams
 Lake Creek (Moose Creek), a tributary of Moose Creek in Alaska
 Lake Creek (Charrette Creek), in Missouri
 Lake Creek (Flat Creek), in Missouri
 Lake Creek (New York), a tributary of Catskill Creek in New York
 Lake Creek (Siuslaw River), in Oregon

Schools
 Lake Creek High School in Montgomery, Texas

See also